Franz Josef Heinrich Georg Meyers (31 July 1908 – 27 January 2002) was a German politician (CDU) and the 4th Minister President of North Rhine-Westphalia between 21 July 1958 and 8 December 1966. He was born and died in Mönchengladbach.

External links  

1908 births
2002 deaths
People from Mönchengladbach
People from the Rhine Province
University of Cologne alumni
Presidents of the German Bundesrat
Christian Democratic Union of Germany politicians
Members of the Landtag of North Rhine-Westphalia
Ministers-President of North Rhine-Westphalia
Grand Crosses 1st class of the Order of Merit of the Federal Republic of Germany